Barani is the capital of the Barani Department of Kossi Province in western Burkina Faso. As of 2005 it had a population of 4,804.

References

Populated places in the Boucle du Mouhoun Region
Kossi Province